Skydance Animation, LLC is an American animation studio that is a division of Skydance Media, founded on March 16, 2017. The studio is in Los Angeles, with offices in Connecticut and Madrid, Spain; the Madrid branch was originally Ilion Animation Studios.

Skydance Animation's first film Luck was released on August 5, 2022, on Apple TV+. Its next film is Spellbound, followed by two other film projects, Pookoo and Ray Gunn, along with a TV series being developed based on the books of The Search for WondLa.

History

In March 2017 Skydance Media formed an animation division and a multi-year partnership with Madrid, Spain-based animation studio Ilion Animation Studios. In July, it announced its first two films, Split, for a release in 2019, and Luck. Both films would be distributed by Paramount Pictures as part of their deal with Skydance Media. On October 10, 2017, Bill Damaschke was hired to head the division as president of animation and family entertainment, and Luck was given a release date of March 19, 2021. In April 2018, Luck was greenlit by Paramount Animation chief Mireille Soria.

Skydance Animation signed on directors Alessandro Carloni (Kung Fu Panda 3) to direct Luck, Vicky Jenson (Shrek) to direct Spellbound), and Nathan Greno (Tangled) to write and direct Pookoo (formerly known as Powerless). Peggy Holmes (Secret of the Wings and The Pirate Fairy) was later announced as new director of Luck, replacing Carloni who left over creative differences.

In January 2019, Skydance Animation hired former Pixar and Walt Disney Animation Studios CCO John Lasseter as Head of Animation, supplanting Damaschke. This decision was met with disapproval from some contributors to various Skydance projects, owing to prior allegations of sexual misconduct against Lasseter during his time with Pixar. Soria announced that the team at Paramount Animation would no longer work with Skydance due to the hiring of Lasseter. Conversely, Damaschke stated that many people "[...] had strong feelings and felt like it was the right thing to do [...] and were excited to get to work with him" and it was "[...] definitely not a black-and-white situation." Emma Thompson was to voice a character in Luck but left the project after Lasseter was hired. Jane Fonda was cast as The Dragon in Luck. Holly Edwards, who previously served as Skydance Animation's Head of Production, was promoted to the position of president at Skydance Animation.

On April 2, 2020, composer Alan Menken revealed that he was working alongside Lasseter on a project for the studio, which was later announced to be Split, which at that point was The Unbreakable Spell before retitled Spellbound. Skydance formally acquired Ilion Animation Studios and rebranded it as Skydance Animation Madrid in April 2020. On July 30, the studio named Shane Prigmore for the newly created position of Senior Vice President of Development for Animation, in which he will oversee the creative development of all feature films and television series. That same month, it was announced that Luck and Spellbound were still going to be released by Paramount without Paramount Animation as part of their deal with Skydance Media, giving the two release dates of February 18, 2022, and November 11, 2022, respectively. Paramount's president of domestic distribution, Chris Aronson stated "These films not only continue our longstanding relationship with Skydance, but, along with Paramount Animation's own upcoming films, mean we will be releasing event-level animated films for years to come." However, on December 16, 2020, Apple TV+ entered talks to take over the distribution rights to the films Luck and Spellbound. Apple Original Films would replace Paramount for both Luck and Spellbound. More recently, in February 2021, Apple signed an overall deal with Skydance Animation which included animated films and television series. This includes a television adaptation of the novel The Search for WondLa by Tony DiTerlizzi. The series has been greenlit for two seasons and was announced to feature showrunner Lauren Montgomery as both writer and executive producer with DiTerlizzi and Chad Quant. She has since left the project and has been replaced by Bobs Gannaway, another of Lasseter's Disney-era colleagues. On June 2020, Shane Prigmore, an animation veteran who co-created Tangled: The Series, was hired as SVP Development at Skydance Animation. He will be tasked with overseeing the creative development of all films and TV series on the studio's production slate.

On October 1, 2021, Skydance Animation released its first short film inspired by a true story from Joe Mateo called Blush. It was released on Apple TV+ as part of their multi-year deal. The ships from the short film became the mascots of the studio during the release of Luck, and a portion of Joy Ngiaw's score was used for the fanfare of the studio.

In February 2022, it was announced that Brad Bird would revive his long-dormant project Ray Gunn for Skydance Animation after it was originally set up at Turner Feature Animation. On March 16, 2022, Rich Moore revealed that he has entered into an exclusive, multi-year overall deal with Skydance Animation. In July 2022, Ellison and Lasseter plan for Skydance Animation to make two feature films a year, with their theatrical strategy to be determined on a film-by-film basis. The company is also building a consumer products team to capitalize on its potential successes and will begin to open a 5.8-acre Santa Monica campus in October, expected to be completed by November 2023.

Production logo
With the release of Blush in October 2021, Skydance Animation's logo revealed their first logo, it represents their logo in silver, in space in the style of Skydance Media's short logo. With the release of Luck in August 2022, their full logo was released and shows the rocket and the UFO from Blush which are now the mascots of the studio launched from their planet (also from Blush) flying around to form the studio's logo with magic blue and pink trails, the fanfare was composed by Joy Ngiaw which was adopted from the score of Blush, it was animated by their Madrid branch, Skydance Animation Madrid and their head of animation, John Lasseter. The behind the music of the studio's logo was posted by Joy Ngiaw as a prototype.

Filmography

Feature films

Released

Upcoming

Short films

Television series

Upcoming

Reception

Critical and public response

Accolades

See also 
Walt Disney Animation Studios
Pixar
Paramount Animation

References

External links
 Official website

2017 establishments in California
American companies established in 2017
Skydance Media
American animation studios
Impact of the COVID-19 pandemic on cinema
Entertainment companies based in California
Film production companies of the United States
Mass media companies established in 2017
Companies based in Santa Monica, California